The Slave Trade Act 1788, also known as Dolben's Act, was an Act of Parliament that limited the number of enslaved people that British slave ships could transport, based on the ships' tons burthen (bm). It was the first British legislation passed to regulate slave shipping.

Background 

In the late 18th century, opposition to slavery was increasing. Many abolitionists were aroused by the Zong massacre, whose details became known during litigation in 1783, when the syndicate owning the ship filed for insurance claims to cover 132–142 slaves who had been killed. Quakers had been active in petitioning Parliament to end the trade. To expand their influence, in 1787 they formed a non-denominational group, the Society for the Abolition of the Slave Trade, which included Anglicans of the established church (non-Anglicans were excluded from Parliament).

In 1788, Sir William Dolben led a group of his fellow Members of Parliament to the River Thames to board and examine a ship being fitted for a slaving voyage. Dolben had been in contact with the Abolition Society in the previous year. His visit to the slave-ship appears to have hardened his opposition to the slave trade.

The Society's campaigning led the Prime Minister, William Pitt, to order an investigation into the slave trade. He also asked William Wilberforce to begin a debate in the House of Commons on the issue. However, by May 1788, the trade committee of the Privy Council—which Pitt had tasked with investigating the slave trade—had not produced its report.

On 9 May 1788, Pitt introduced a motion to the House of Commons which asked whether parliament should delay its consideration of the slave trade until its next session. He argued that the great number of anti-slavery petitions that had been presented to the House on this topic meant that a proper consideration of the issue could not occur with so little time left in the current parliamentary session. Representatives from Liverpool, a city whose merchants controlled much of the British slave trade and whose economy was deeply tied to it, welcomed Pitt's motion. They argued for a debate to enable them to refute the accusations about the slave trade made in the petitions submitted to the House.

Sir William Dolben, representing Oxford University, eventually rose to speak. He argued that 10,000 lives would be lost if the House did not immediately intervene to curtail the abuses perpetrated during the Middle Passage. He said that immediate measures should be introduced to restrict the number of Africans that slave ship captains could take on board, as a means to reduce losses. This would reduce mortality due to the diseases of overcrowding and poor sanitation. Although Dolben opposed the slave trade, he did not at this time propose abolishing it or the institution of slavery.

Dolben's speech was disputed by Lord Penrhyn, one of the two MPs for Liverpool. He claimed that captains were highly motivated to preserve the lives of as many slaves as possible, so that they could profit from their sale.

Encouraged by Pitt, Dolben drafted a bill and submitted it to the House on 21 May. The bill passed its second reading on 17 June, and its third reading the following day. It was sent to the House of Lords, where it was approved in its first, second, and third readings, the last of which occurred on 2 July. However, because the Lords had amended the bill—adding a compensation clause, which the Commons felt infringed its right to deal exclusively with money matters—a new bill was drafted, passed, and resubmitted to the Lords. This was passed by them on 10 July, and received royal assent soon after. It was the first British legislation to regulate slave ships.

Provisions 

The act held that ships could transport 1.67 slaves per ton up to a maximum of 207 tons burthen, after which only 1 slave per ton could be carried.

The provisions of the 1788 act expired after one year, meaning that the act had to be renewed annually by parliament. Dolben led the effort to do this in subsequent years, so he regularly spoke against the slave trade in parliament. The act was renewed between 1789 and 1795 and between 1797 and 1798. In 1799 the provisions of the previous acts were made permanent through the Slave Trade Act of 1799.

Support and opposition 
The act was supported by some abolitionists, including Olaudah Equiano, an African who was a former slave. But, some abolitionists, such as William Wilberforce, feared that the act would establish the idea that the slave trade was not fundamentally unjust, but merely an activity that needed further regulation.

Effect
The mortality of slaves on British ships declined during the 1790s. This act helped to lower the overall mortality rate of British ships during the 1790–1830 time period. Due to the lower density of slaves, illnesses could be controlled and food rations would last longer. During this period, ship captains were also given incentives for lower mortality rates. As their incentives would grow, their mortality rates would continue to lower. This information could have been manipulated by greedy captains but the research shows a general downward trend.

The historian Roger Anstey has suggested that this decline might be explained by the restrictions of the Act. But the research of several other historians has suggested that there is no demonstrable relationship between reduced crowding and lower mortality rates amongst slaves. More recent research suggests that early work was plagued with measurement error due to bad record keeping, and this act did reduce crowding-related mortality. Slave mortality on Dutch ships, which were not subject to restrictions on the number of slaves carried, did not decline during the same period.

Notes

Bibliography 
 
 
 Nigel Aston, ‘Dolben, Sir William, third baronet (1727–1814)’, Oxford Dictionary of National Biography, Oxford University Press, 2004.

External links 
 Parliament and the British Slave Trade 1600-1833

Great Britain Acts of Parliament 1788
Slave trade legislation
Abolitionism in the United Kingdom